Pierre Adam Omanga (born 10 April 1988 in Paris, France) is a French footballer.

Career

College and amateur
Omanga played college soccer at the University of Montevallo in 2012 and Southern New Hampshire University in 2013.

During his college years Omanga also played for GPS Portland Phoenix in the USL Premier Development League.

Professional
On 21 January 2014 Omanga was drafted in the third round (50th overall) of the 2014 MLS SuperDraft by New England Revolution.

Omanga signed with New England's USL Pro affiliate Rochester Rhinos in March 2014. He went on to make his professional debut on 3 August 2014 in a 0-0 draw with Orlando City.

In May 2015 Omanga was signed by the Finnish side FC Jazz.

References

External links
 

1988 births
Living people
French footballers
French expatriate footballers
French expatriate sportspeople in the United States
GPS Portland Phoenix players
Rochester New York FC players
Association football forwards
Expatriate soccer players in the United States
New England Revolution draft picks
USL League Two players
USL Championship players
Expatriate footballers in Finland
Ykkönen players
FC Jazz players
University of Montevallo alumni
Southern New Hampshire Penmen men's soccer players
Footballers from Paris